"C-O-U-N-T-R-Y" is a song recorded by American country music artist Joe Diffie. It was released in March 1996 as the second single from the 1995 album Life's So Funny. It reached No. 23 on the Billboard Hot Country Singles & Tracks chart.  The song was written by Dusty Drake, Ed Hill and Ron Harbin.

Chart performance

References

Songs about country music
1995 songs
1996 singles
Joe Diffie songs
Songs written by Ron Harbin
Songs written by Ed Hill
Epic Records singles